"Better Days" is a song by a Canadian pop rock band Hedley. The song was released off their seventh studio album Cageless. The song was released in 2017 and was certified platinum in Canada.

Music video
The music video for "Better Days" was released on October 27, 2017, and the video was directed by Ally Pankiw. Hoggard described the premise of the video as "making a modest, very subtle, passive attempt at making people's days better". The band's guitarist, Dave Rosin, added, "We always have a good time shooting videos and then there are those shoots where, once it's edited, and you get to see it in its finished form."

Track listing
Digital download

Brokedown version

Charts

Certifications

References

2017 songs
2017 singles
Hedley (band) songs
Universal Music Canada singles
Songs written by Jacob Hoggard
Songs written by Brian Howes